Southwest Petroleum University (SWPU) is a Chinese university founded in Nanchong, Sichuan in 1958. It is a public university of Chinese state under the Double First Class University Plan.

Introduction
Southwest Petroleum University (SWPU), located in suburb of Chengdu City and Nanchong City, was founded in 1958. SWPU was originally named Sichuan Petroleum Institute and in 1970, was renamed to Southwest Petroleum Institute. It became Southwest Petroleum University (SWPU) after achieving university status in 2005. Originally, SWPU was supported and administered by the Ministry of Petroleum Industry and the China National Petroleum Corporation (CNPC). Since 2000, the university has been co-administered by both Sichuan Province and CNPC.

SWPU has two campuses: the original campus at Nanchong City and the main campus at Chengdu City with a total area of about 3,000 mu (494 acres). The total floor space is more than 900,000 square meters.

The university is divided into 18 schools and departments that, together, offer 60 bachelor's degree programs. SWPU is one of the first universities in China that was authorized to confer bachelor, masters and doctoral degrees. It has one provincial-level graduate school offering three post-doctoral research programs. SWPU has 23 doctor's degree programs, 85 master's degree programs, and one key discipline program in oil and gas engineering. At the provincial and ministerial level, it has seven laboratories and 25 research and technical centers, including a center for well-completion techniques built with the assistance of the United Nations. In addition, it has the Sino-Canadian Training Center for Natural Gas Exploration and Exploitation, built with the support of the Canadian government. At the national level, it has one key laboratory of Oil and Gas Reservoir Geology and Exploitation in which three key disciplines are pursued. Under the auspices of the Ministry of Education, SWPU owns an oil and gas equipment key laboratory, the Natural Gas Exploitation Engineering Research Center, and the Oil Field Petrochemical Engineering Research Center. At the university, two extensive libraries are available offering a collection of over two million volumes.

Students from across the nation attend SWPU. Each year, more than 5,000 first-year undergraduates enroll in addition to over 1,000 first-year master's and doctoral degree candidates. The present enrollment of full-time students is more than 32,498, including 8 international students, 26,490 undergraduates, 3,801 postgraduates and 715 PhD students. More than 100,000 students have graduated from SWPU since its establishment. Within the past ten years, the proportion of students successfully being employed is more than 94 percent every year.

Currently there are 2,397 academic staff and general staff, of which there are 1.664 full-time teaching staff, including 211 full-professors.

SWPU has been involved in over 6,121 scientific programs since 2001 and has obtained 783 million RMB (renminbi) in scientific funding, winning 95 provincial or ministerial prizes. 495 patents have been approved, 184 of which are invented patents.

SWPU has established worldwide cooperative relationships with universities and research institutions, including those in the United States, United Kingdom, Japan, France, Germany, Canada, Russia and India. One example being a  2+2 degree program with the University of Leeds, UK.

Administration
The schools and departments are organized into the following divisions:

Schools and departments
 School of Oil and Natural Gas Engineering
 School of Geosciences and Technology
 School of Mechanical Engineering
 School of Chemistry and Chemical Engineering
 School of New Energy and Materials
 School of Computer Science
 School of Electronics and Information Engineering
 School of Civil Engineering and Architecture
 School of Sciences
 School of Economics and Management / MBA
 Educational Center
 School of Law
 School of Marxism
 School of Foreign Languages
 School of Physical Education
 School of Art
 School of Vocational and Technical Education

National Level Key Disciplines 
Southwest Petroleum University has a number of National Key Disciplines.
Oil and Gas Exploitation Engineering
Oil and Gas Drilling Engineering
Oil and Gas Storage and Transportation Engineering

Provincial or Ministerial Level Key Disciplines
Applied Chemistry (Both Provincial and Ministerial Level )
Mineral Survey and Exploration (Provincial Level )
Mechanical Design and Theory (Both Provincial and Ministerial Level )
Mechanical Manufacture and Automation (Provincial Level )
Geodetection and Information Technology (Provincial Level )

History
1958-1962 Sichuan Petroleum Institute run by the local government of Sichuan Province

1962-1970 Sichuan Petroleum Institute run by the Ministry of Petroleum Industry, P.R.China

1970-1978 Southwest Petroleum Institute run by the local government of Sichuan Province

1978-1988 Southwest Petroleum Institute run by the Ministry of Petroleum Industry, P.R. China

1988-1998 Southwest Petroleum Institute run by China National Petroleum Corporation, P.R.China

1998-2000 Southwest Petroleum Institute run by China National Petroleum Corporation (Group), P.R.China

2000-2005 Southwest Petroleum Institute run by the local government of Sichuan Province

2005- Southwest Petroleum University run by the local government of Sichuan Province

References

External links
Southwest Petroleum University Official Website

Universities and colleges in Sichuan
Universities and colleges in Chengdu
Educational institutions established in 1958
Petroleum engineering schools
1958 establishments in China